The Fight was an English pop punk band, founded in 2000 in Dudley, West Midlands, England. The band consisted of singer and guitarist Kate Turley, drummer Jack Turley (her younger brother), Scott Milner also on guitar and bassist Tom Calder. In 2002, New Found Glory's road crew overheard them busking outside a gig in Leicester. When New Found Glory’s guitarist, Chad Gilbert, heard their record he invited them to open for them in London and took their demo back to his label. They were signed by Fat Wreck Chords who put out their first EP, Home Is Where the Hate Is, in 2003.  Their first album Nothing New Since Rock 'n' Roll was released in 2004 on Repossession Records. The Fight have toured the UK, Japan and the United States with bands such as Rancid, Yellowcard, Sugarcult, Brand New and the Starting Line and played on the Warped Tour in summer 2005.

Discography

Albums/EPs
 Home Is Where the Hate Is (EP) (2003), Fat Wreck Chords
 Nothing New Since Rock 'n' Roll (2004), Repossession Records

Singles
 "Revolution Calling"
 "Can't Be Bothered"

Music videos 
 "Revolution Calling" (2004)
 "Can't Be Bothered" (2004)

Band members 
 Kate Turley – vocals, guitar
 Jack Turley – drums
 Tom Calder – bass
 Scott Milner – guitar

Past members
 Matthew Vale – bass
 Simon Lincoln Jefferies – guitar

References

External links 
 The Fight on Myspace

English pop punk groups
English buskers
Musical groups established in 2000
Repossession Records artists
Fat Wreck Chords artists